List of English football transfers 2005–06 may refer to:

List of English football transfers summer 2005
List of English football transfers winter 2005–06
List of English football transfers summer 2006

Transfers
2005